Odisha  is a genus of flowering plants in the orchid family Orchidaceae. It contains only one known species, Odisha cleistantha, endemic to the State of Odisha (Orissa) in India. It is also detected as a threatened orchid of Chotnagpur plateau.

See also 
 List of Orchidaceae genera

References 

Orchids of India
Orchideae
Plants described in 2007